Sibley State Park is a Minnesota state park near New London, on the shores of Lake Andrew. It is named for Henry Hastings Sibley, the first governor of the state. A city park in Mankato, Minnesota is also named for Sibley.

The rustic style stone structures in the park were constructed by the Civilian Conservation Corps between 1935 and 1938. These structures are now listed on the National Register of Historic Places. The layout of the park was a very functional example of master planning because it reduced congestion and overcrowding for swimmers, picnickers, and campers. It is rumored that a secret cache of memorabilia and other various items are buried underground in one of the park areas near the beach.

Wildlife
This park is home to mammalian species of white-tailed deer, red and gray foxes, coyote, raccoon, chipmunk, red and gray squirrels, mink, striped skunk, badger, and woodchuck. Bird watchers receive an opportunity to view ruffed grouses, great blue herons, egrets, wood ducks, Canada geese, scarlet tanagers, indigo buntings, pelicans, loons and bluebirds.

References

External links

Sibley State Park
Sibley State Park - Minnesota Historical Society

1919 establishments in Minnesota
Civilian Conservation Corps in Minnesota
IUCN Category V
Park buildings and structures on the National Register of Historic Places in Minnesota
Protected areas established in 1919
Protected areas of Kandiyohi County, Minnesota
Rustic architecture in Minnesota
State parks of Minnesota
Historic districts on the National Register of Historic Places in Minnesota
National Register of Historic Places in Kandiyohi County, Minnesota